Swayambhu Sri Abhista Gnana Ganapathi Temple is a Swayambhu (Self Manifested) Ganapathi temple in Kurnool, known as SSAGG temple 
located in Kurnool district of the Indian state of Andhra Pradesh.

Swayambhu Sri Abhista Gnana Ganapathi Deity 

Swayambhu Sri Abhista  Gnana Ganapathi is a self manifested idol found on 18 October 2002. 
Lord is self growing since the time of finding i.e. Swayam vriddhi Ganapathi.
Mayuri Greenlands in Kurnool is home to this popular Hindu temple of Lord Ganesha called as SSAGG Temple.
It was constructed by the Jampala Family under the Jampala Abhinay Charitable trust. 
Temple was constructed by founders Srimathi & Sri Jampala Lakshmi Kanthi and 
Jampala Madhusudhan Rao & Family at Mayuri Greenlands, 
Bangalore Highway NH-44/NH-7, 
Kurnool.

History 

The temple of Swayambhu Sri Abhista Gnana Ganapathi situated at Mayuri Greenlands is 5 km away from the Kurnool city. The temple was constructed under the management of Mr. & Mrs. Jampala Madhusudhan Rao, who are also the trustees of "Jampala Abhinai Charitable Trust (JACT)".
Here is a brief history regarding how this idol of Lord Vinayaka came into existence.

It all started in the year 2002, when Mr.& Mrs. Jampala Madhusudhan Rao and family resided at Kalyani Nagar, Hyderabad. A new multi storeyed building was under construction right in front of the house where they resided. As a result, there were heaps of sand, brought from the Manjira River, deposited in front of the house. Their eleven-year-old child Abhinai Jampala used to play in those heaps along with his friends. One fine day, he found a big green stone (called Marakatha), about the size of muskmelon, amidst those heaps of sand. The moment he saw it, found a remarkable resemblance between the shape of the stone and that of shape of Lord Vinayaka. Despite the fun his friends made of him for treating that stone as Lord Vinayaka,  Abhinai chose to listen to his conscience and ignore his friends. He took this idol home and proudly handed it over to his mom, Mrs. Jampala Kanthi, saying that he has found Lord Ganesha. Amused by her little boy's observation, she decided to keep the idol in the show case.

From that day onwards, the boy started praying to the idol every morning, treating it as Lord Ganesha. Whatever he was given to eat, before eating it he used to place it in front of the irol. Delighted by his devotion, his mother started believing the stone as the idol of Lord Ganesha and placed it in the pooja room alongside the idols of other gods and used to offer him with the daily prayers. Abhinai often used to share his wish of building a temple for his idol of Lord Ganesha, with his mother.

Now, to everybody's amusement, the idol started growing gradually and started to take more precise shape of Lord Vinayaka. The idol has now formed trunk, eyes, cards and almost exactly resembles the structure of Lord Ganesha.
In 2011, due to some unfortunate circumstances, Abhinai had reached the adobe of gods. In his memory, his parents founded the "Jampala Abhinai Charitable Trust (JACT): and have been organizing many spiritual programmes. In 2012, his parents decided to fulfil Abhinai's wish of building a temple to his favourite idol of Lord Ganesha. Temple construction was completed successfully without any interruptions with the Vigna Vinayaka blessings in a span of nine months."

The grand event of the "Vigraha Prathishta" took place starting from 22 to 24 August 2013, under the vedic mantra chanting of the pandits. Since then, "Varshika Brahmotsavam", is being conducted on 18 October (the day the boy found the idol), every year.  People here have started to strongly believe that their wishes were being fulfilled after praying the lord "Swayambhu Sri Abhista Gnana Ganapathi". According to the tradition being followed here, people perform eleven circumambulations (Pradhakshina) and pray the Lord, in order to fulfil their wished. Later, once their wishes are met, people come back and perform twenty one  circumambulations (Pradhakshina) as a token of thanking the god.

With the help of "Jampala Abhinai Charitable Trust", a park has been built in front of the temple which serves as a playground for the children and the shade provided by the trees inside the park serves as a resting place of old people in the scorching sun. every month, "Lakshmi Ganapathi Homam" is also conducted on the temple premises, on the eve of "Sankashta Hara Chathurthi".

This way, Lord, "Swayambhu Sri Abhista Gnana Ganapathi" is showering his blessings on everybody who believes in him, irrespective of their caste, creed and religion.

Gallery 

Google Map temple location

References

Kurnool
Hindu temples in Kurnool district
Ganesha temples